Reappearance may refer to:

 Record of Agarest War: Re-appearance, a 2008 role-playing video game
 Reappearance (novel), a 2002 science fiction novel

See also

 Appearance (disambiguation)